1998 saw the 14th edition of the Yamaha Thailand Cup.

It was Thailand's main inter-provincial competition, played between qualifiers from various regions.

The first round saw four groups of four teams, of which the top two sides qualified for the Quarter-Final knockout stage.

Bangkok Metropolitan Administration FC beat Nakhon Si Thammarat FC in the final.

Group A

Bangkok Metropolitan Administration FC
Phatthalung
Amnat Charoen
Pathum Tani

Results

Bangkok Metropolitan Administration FC and Amnat Charoen advance to Quarter-Final stage.

Group B

Phetchaburi
Pichit
Nakhon Sri Thammarat FC
Ubon Ratchathani

Results

Nakhon Si Thammarat FC and Phetchaburi advanced to the next round

Group C

Ayutthaya
Si Saket FC
Phitsanulok FC
Sa Kaeo

Results

Ayutthaya and Phitsanulok FC advanced to the next round

Group D

Tak
Lopburi FC
Samut Songkhram FC
Ranong

External links
Official Website 
Football Association of Thailand 
Thailand Premier League FIFA
Thailand - List of Champions RSSSF

Yamaha